Raveena is a given name. Notable people with the name include:

 Raveena Ravi (born 1993), Indian voice actress
 Raveena Tandon (born 1974), Indian actress, model, and producer
 Raveena Tandon filmography
 Raveena Aurora (born 1993), American singer-songwriter mononymously known as Raveena

See also
 Raveen
 Simply Baatein With Raveena, Indian television chat show